Chaurasiya, Chaurasia is a surname used by brahmin community in India. Notable people with the surname include:

Ajaya Kumar Chaurasiya, Nepalese politician
Alok Kumar Chaurasiya, Indian politician
Rameshwar Chaurasiya, Indian politician
Sanjeev Chaurasiya , Indian politician
Deepak Chaurasia, Indian journalist
Hariprasad Chaurasia, Indian music director and flautist
Rakesh Chaurasia, Indian flautist
Ganga Prasad Chaurasia, Indian politician, Governor of Sikkim
Soni Chaurasia, Indian dancer

References